Mae and Philip Rothstein House is a historic home located at Raleigh, Wake County, North Carolina.  It was built in 1959, and is a one-story, International Style dwelling measuring 80 feet by 27 feet.  It has a low-pitched, gable-front roof, with a deep overhang.  It features three-tiered floor-to-ceiling windows.

It was listed on the National Register of Historic Places in 2005.

References

Houses on the National Register of Historic Places in North Carolina
International style architecture in North Carolina
Houses completed in 1959
Houses in Raleigh, North Carolina
National Register of Historic Places in Raleigh, North Carolina